The Women's road time trial C4 road cycling event at the 2016 Summer Paralympics took place on the afternoon of 14 September at Flamengo Park, Pontal. 9 riders competed over two laps of a fifteen kilometre course.

The C4 category is for cyclists with moderate upper limb impairment.

Results
Women's road time trial C4. 14 September 2016, Rio.

References

Women's road time trial C4